The 87th Infantry Division ("Golden Acorn") was a unit of the United States Army in World War I and World War II.

World War I
The 87th Division was a National Army division, made up of draftees from Alabama, Arkansas, Louisiana and Mississippi. It was activated at Camp Pike, Arkansas on 25 August 1917. Like many units, the 87th Division was used to furnish personnel for other units scheduled for earlier overseas departure. Before November 1917, most of the enlisted men were transferred to other units (2,400 to the 81st Division, 3,000 to the 31st Division, and 8,000 to the 39th Division). The division was reconstituted from draftees drawn from the Midwest. Between January and June 1918, 40,000 men arrived at Camp Pike, but 30,000 left. The 87th Division lost more than 20,000 men, and numbered 15,000 men in June 1918. It was again reconstituted, with draftees mostly from New Jersey, New York, and Pennsylvania. It went overseas in September 1918, but was utilized as a pool of laborers by the Services of Supply, American Expeditionary Forces. It returned to the United States in January 1919 to Camp Dix, New Jersey, and was demobilized in February 1919.

 MG Samuel D. Sturgis (25 August 1917).
 BG Robert Campbell Van Vliet (13 November 1917).
 MG Samuel D. Sturgis.
 COL John O'Shea (6 October 1918).
 MG Samuel D. Sturgis (23 October 1918).
 BG W. F. Martin (22 November 1918).

Order of battle

 Headquarters, 87th Division
 173rd Infantry Brigade
 345th Infantry Regiment
 346th Infantry Regiment
 335th Machine Gun Battalion
 174th Infantry Brigade
 347th Infantry Regiment
 348th Infantry Regiment
 336th Machine Gun Battalion
 162nd Field Artillery Brigade
 334th Field Artillery Regiment (75 mm)
 335th Field Artillery Regiment (75 mm)
 336th Field Artillery Regiment (155 mm)
 312th Trench Mortar Battery
 334th Machine Gun Battalion 
 312th Engineer Regiment
 312th Medical Regiment
 312th Field Signal Battalion
 Headquarters Troop, 87th Division
 312th Train Headquarters and Military Police
 312th Ammunition Train
 312th Supply Train
 312th Engineer Train
 312th Sanitary Train
 345th, 346th, 347th, and 348th Ambulance Companies and Field Hospitals

Interwar period

The division was reconstituted in the Organized Reserve on 24 June 1921 and assigned to the states of Alabama, Louisiana, and Mississippi. The headquarters was organized on 23 September 1921.

World War II

The 87th Infantry Division was ordered into active military service on 15 December 1942 at Camp McCain, Mississippi. It was nicknamed the "Baby Division" because many of its initial filler soldiers were among the first eighteen year olds conscripted after the lower limit of the draft age was reduced from twenty to eighteen years old in November 1942. It moved to the Tennessee Maneuver Area on 3 December 1943, for the Second Army #4 Tennessee Maneuvers, and consolidated at Fort Jackson, South Carolina on 20 January 1944 for divisional training. The division staged at Camp Kilmer, at Stelton (now Edison), New Jersey, on 10 October 1944 until it received its port call to the New York Port of Embarkation in Brooklyn, New York. It sailed to the European Theater on 17 October 1944, arrived in England on 12 November 1944, and staged for movement to France. It was assigned to the Third Army on 25 November 1944, and arrived at Le Havre, France, on 28 November 1944. The 87th was further assigned to the III Corps on 4 December 1944, and to the XII Corps on 11 December 1944, to the XV Corps on 21 December 1944, and to the VIII Corps on 29 December 1944. Crossed into Belgium on 12 January 1945, and returned to XII Corps on 14 January 1945. Crossed into Luxembourg on 21 January 1945, and assigned to VIII Corps on 25 January 1945. Because of discontinuity in the German railroad system, the 87th was routed to Germany by returning to Belgium on 3 February 1945. Entered Germany 16 March 1945, and remained to VE Day. Returned to the United States at the New York Port of Embarkation on 11 July 1945, and proceeded to Fort Benning, Georgia on 14 July 1945 to prepare for deployment to Japan; it was at Fort Benning on VJ Day. The 87th Infantry Division was inactivated on 21 September 1945, at Fort Benning.

Campaigns: Rhineland, Ardennes-Alsace, Central Europe.
Days of combat: 154.
Distinguished Unit Citation: 2.
Awards:
Medal of Honor-1 ;
Distinguished Service Cross-9 ;
Distinguished Service Medal-1 ;
Silver Star-364;
Legion of Merit −20;
Soldier's Medal −41 ;
Bronze Star  −1,542 ;
Air Medal −49.

Commanders:
 MG Percy W. Clarkson (December 1942 – October 1943),
 MG Eugene M. Landrum (October 1943 – April 1944),
 MG Frank L. Culin Jr. (April 1944 to inactivation).

Returned to U.S.: 11 July 1945.
Inactivated: 20 September 1945.

Combat chronicle

The 87th Infantry Division arrived in Scotland, 22 October 1944, and trained in England, 23 October-30 November. It landed in France, 1–3 December, and moved to Metz, where, on 8 December, it went into action against and took Fort Driant. The division then shifted to the vicinity of Gros-Réderching near the Saar-German border on 10 December and captured Rimling, Obergailbach, and Guiderkirch.

The 87th was moving into Germany when, on 16 December 1944, German Field Marshal Von Rundstedt launched his offensive in the Ardennes forest (Battle of the Bulge). The Division was placed in SHAEF (Supreme Headquarters Allied Expeditionary Force) reserve, 24–28 December, then thrown into the Bulge battle in Belgium, 29 December. In a fluctuating battle, it captured Moircy on 30 December and Remagne on 31 December. On 2 January 1945, it took Gérimont, on 10 January Tillet, and reached the Ourthe by 13 January. On 15 January 1945, the division moved to Luxembourg to relieve the 4th Infantry Division along the Sauer and seized Wasserbillig on 23 January. The 87th moved to the vicinity of St. Vith, 28 January, and attacked and captured Schlierbach, Selz, and Hogden by the end of the month. After the fall of Neuendorf, 9 February, the division went on the defensive until 26 February, when Ormont and Hallschlag were taken in night attacks. The 87th crossed the Kyll River, 6 March, took Dollendorf on 8 March, and after a brief rest, returned to combat, 13 March 1945, crossing the Moselle on 16th and clearing Koblenz, 18–19 March. The division crossed the Rhine, 25–26 March, despite strong opposition, consolidated its bridgehead, and secured Grossenlinden and Langgöns. On 7 April, it jumped off in an attack which carried it through Thuringia into Saxony. Plauen fell, 17 April, and the division took up defensive positions, 20 April, about 4 miles from the border to Czechoslovakia. On 6 May 1945, it took Falkenstein and maintained its positions until Victory in Europe Day.

The 87th Division returned to the States in July 1945 expecting to be called upon to play a role in the defeat of the Imperial Japanese, but the sudden termination of the war in the Pacific while the division was reassembling at Fort Benning changed the future of the 87th. The division was inactivated 21 September 1945.

The last active soldier from the division that served in World War II retired in June of 1981. Colonel Vedder B. Driscoll (1925–1983), who had enlisted in 1943 and was a platoon sergeant for Company I, 345th Infantry, achieved thirty years of commissioned service.

Casualties
Total battle casualties: 6,034
Killed in action: 1,154
Wounded in action: 4,342
Missing in action: 109
Prisoner of war: 429

Assignments in European Theater of Operations
25 November 1944: Third Army, 12th Army Group.
4 December 1944: III Corps.
11 December 1944: XII Corps.
21 December 1944: XV Corps, Seventh Army, 6th Army Group.
29 December 1944: VIII Corps, Third Army, 12th Army Group.
14 January 1945: XII Corps.
25 January 1945: VIII Corps.
22 April 1945: VIII Corps, First Army, 12th Army Group.

Order of battle

 Headquarters, 87th Infantry Division
 345th Infantry Regiment
 346th Infantry Regiment
 347th Infantry Regiment
 Headquarters and Headquarters Battery, 87th Infantry Division Artillery
 334th Field Artillery Battalion (105 mm)
 335th Field Artillery Battalion (155 mm)
 336th Field Artillery Battalion (105 mm)
 912th Field Artillery Battalion (105 mm)
 312th Engineer Combat Battalion
 312th Medical Battalion
 87th Cavalry Reconnaissance Troop (Mechanized)
 Headquarters, Special Troops, 87th Infantry Division
 Headquarters Company, 87th Infantry Division
 787th Ordnance Light Maintenance Company
 87th Quartermaster Company
 87th Signal Company
 Military Police Platoon
 Band
 87th Counterintelligence Corps Detachment

Decorations

Postwar
The 87th Infantry Division was reformed in the Organized Reserve Corps after the war, in the Third Army area. It comprised units in Alabama, Tennessee, Mississippi, and Florida. It was inactivated on 15 February 1957 in Birmingham, Alabama, and subsequently the division shoulder sleeve insignia and number, but not the division lineage and honors, were used by the 87th Maneuver Area Command (MAC), also in Birmingham, with sixteen subordinate battalions. The 87th MAC was later inactivated and, on 1 October 1993, the lineage of the 87th Infantry Division was redesignated as Headquarters, 87th Division (Exercise) and activated at Birmingham, Alabama. On 17 October 1999 it was reorganized and redesignated Headquarters, 87th Division (Training Support).

According to Global Security, "On 16 January 2006, First US Army's mission expanded to include the training, readiness oversight, and mobilization for all US Army Reserve and Army National Guard units within the continental United States and 2 US territories. First US Army assumed authority from Fifth US Army, which was transforming into United States Army North (ARNORTH), assuming nationwide responsibility for homeland security. With its new role, First US Army developed two subordinate multi-component headquarters, one division to support the eastern United States and the other to support the western United States. Division East, First US Army Division East was activated on 7 March 2007, and was headquartered at Fort George G. Meade, Maryland. Division East replaced the functions previously performed by US Army Reserve divisions, like the 87th Division, in its area of responsibility. As a result, the 87th Division's brigades were subsequently inactivated and the 87th Division was reorganized and redesignated as the 87th Army Reserve Support Command. The 87th Army Reserve Support Command assumed command and control of the newly formed Mobilization Support Group East and its 16 subordinate battalions effective 16 October 2008."

On 1 October 2015 the 87th Army Reserve Support Command was inactivated. 

On September 22nd, 2021. The 87th Training Division was reactivated in Hoover, Alabama under the 84th Training Command.
<ref>

References

The Army Almanac: A Book of Facts Concerning the Army of the United States U.S. Government Printing Office, 1950 reproduced at
http://www.history.army.mil/html/forcestruc/cbtchron/cbtchron.html.
Stalwart and Strong: The Story of the 87th Infantry Division
87th Infantry Division Association

Infantry divisions of the United States Army
Infantry Division, U.S. 087
Military units and formations established in 1917
Military units and formations disestablished in 2015
United States Army divisions of World War I
Infantry divisions of the United States Army in World War II